Anthony Paul Woolley (born 4 December 1971) is an English cricketer. He was a right-handed batsman and a right-arm medium-pace bowler who played for Derbyshire during three years in cricket.

He first played for Derbyshire's second team in 1997, in a drawn match, though it was not until two years later that he played first-class cricket for the team, in one match against Essex in June 1999. He played sporadically during the 1999 season in Division Two of the National League, though Derbyshire performed poorly and he was not to be selected for a second year.

He played club cricket for Alvaston and Boulton in the Derbyshire Premier Cricket League until 2011.

References

External links
Anthony Woolley at Cricket Archive 

1971 births
Living people
Cricketers from Derby
English cricketers
Derbyshire cricketers
Derbyshire Cricket Board cricketers